Theclopsis  gargara  is a Neotropical butterfly in the family Lycaenidae. It is found in  Brazil (Pará), Colombia, and Panama.

References

Theclinae